Romano Hummel (born 4 January 1999) is an international speedway rider from the Netherlands.

Speedway career 
Hummel became the Long Track World Champion, after winning the 2021 Individual Long Track World Championship. He had previously won a bronze medal at the 2017 Team Long Track World Championship.

He rode in the 2016 Premier League speedway season of British Speedway in 2016, riding for the Berwick Bandits.

References 

Living people
1999 births
British speedway riders
Berwick Bandits riders